Jupiter Farms is a community in Palm Beach County, Florida, United States. Jupiter Farms, locally known as "The Farms", is located west of Florida's Turnpike on Indiantown Road (County Road 706), the major highway through the community. The exact population is unknown. In 2010 the population was approximately 12,000.

Geography
It is located west of the Town of Jupiter.

Demographics
As of the census of 2000, there were 11,994 people in 3,829 households residing in the CDP. There were 4,437 housing units.

Notable residents
It is now the site of a luxury home development. 

Musician "El Jefe" Tater, frontman, leading vocalist and instrumentalist of the legendary mariachi band "Tater and the Guats", lives in Jupiter Farms.   Tater and the Guats are most known for their community activism amongst the strong Guatemalan community within Jupiter Farms, and have been credited with raising over $500,000 at their benefit concerts, to pay court costs and bail for Guatemalan's accused of various traffic-related, and other crimes.

References

Unincorporated communities in Palm Beach County, Florida
Census-designated places in Florida
Unincorporated communities in Florida